Ajala is a surname. Notable people with the surname include:

 David Ajala (born 1986), British actor
 Toby Ajala (born 1991), English footballer

See also
 Ajal
 Ajaland